Roberto Antonio Urrutia Herdez (born December 7, 1957), known as Tony Urrutia, was a Cuban-American Olympic weightlifter. He later defected to, and competed for, the United States.

Weightlifting achievements 
 Senior world champion (1977–1979).
 Olympic team member (Cuban Team 1976; U.S.A. Team 1988 and 1992).
 Pan Am Games champion (1975 and 1979).
 Bronze medalist in Pan Am Games (1987).
 Senior national champion (1987–1989, 1991, and 1992).
 Set five world records during career.
 All-time senior American record holder in clean and jerk and total.

Notes

References

External links 
 

1957 births
Living people
American male weightlifters
Cuban male weightlifters
Pan American Games gold medalists for Cuba
Olympic weightlifters of Cuba
Pan American Games bronze medalists for the United States
Olympic weightlifters of the United States
Weightlifters at the 1976 Summer Olympics
Weightlifters at the 1988 Summer Olympics
Weightlifters at the 1992 Summer Olympics
Defecting sportspeople of Cuba
Cuban emigrants to the United States
Pan American Games medalists in weightlifting
Weightlifters at the 1975 Pan American Games
Weightlifters at the 1979 Pan American Games
Medalists at the 1975 Pan American Games
Medalists at the 1979 Pan American Games
20th-century American people
21st-century American people